Two Girls and a Guy is a 1997 American black comedy-drama film written and directed by James Toback and produced by Edward R. Pressman and Chris Hanley. It stars Robert Downey Jr., Heather Graham and Natasha Gregson Wagner.

The film is mainly based upon dialogue between the characters. It was shot almost entirely in real time, and within a single setting, leading some reviewers to compare the film to a stage play.

Director James Toback told interviewers he wrote the film's screenplay in only four days and shot the film in eleven days.

Plot 
Two girls, Carla and Lou meet on the street outside a loft waiting for their boyfriends. After a short time, they find out that they're waiting for the same guy – young actor Blake, who said that he loves both of them but had actually been leading a double life for several months. Angry, they break into his loft and when he returns, a round of accusations and explanations begins.

Cast 
 Robert Downey Jr. as Blake Allen
 Heather Graham as Carla Bennett
 Natasha Gregson Wagner as Lou
 Frederique van der Wal as Carol
  Angel David as Tommy

Production

Casting
Alongside The Gingerbread Man, the film was Robert Downey Jr.'s first role after a 1996 drug arrest. It has been reported that Downey Jr. was drug-tested on the set every day, and that roles such as this helped him temporarily stay clean before his eventual relapse in September 1997. In an interview with People magazine, Natasha Gregson Wagner implied she accepted the role of Louise (nicknamed Lou in the film) because she wanted to appear in unconventional or controversial pictures, stating that "I like working with bold people who want to make an impact. I’m not interested in being just another pretty face."

In 2018, Natasha Leggero revealed on Jimmy Kimmel Live! that director James Toback sexually harassed her under the guise of potentially casting her for Two Girls and a Guy.

Filming and post-production
Principal photography began during early 1997 in New York City. Before filming commenced, Gregson Wagner convinced director James Toback to remove a scene he originally wanted where her character masturbated to Downey Jr. and Heather Graham having sex, as she believed it was not realistic.

In order for the film to receive an R-rating rather than an NC-17 rating, the sex scene involving Downey Jr. and Graham was toned down and re-edited. Both cuts have since been made available on home media.

Release 
Two Girls and a Guy was copyrighted in 1997 and received its premiere at the 1997 Toronto International Film Festival. Originally an independent film, it was picked up by 20th Century Fox's indie acquisition division Fox Searchlight Pictures for a theatrical run in April 1998. It would be released to VHS, Laserdisc, and DVD in the late 90s and early 2000s by 20th Century Fox Home Entertainment, and was subsequently released on a Blu-ray by the company in late 2009, which includes both the R-rated and NC-17 versions. The Blu-ray edition includes a commentary track with Downey Jr., Gregson Wagner and Toback that originally appeared on Fox's 2002 DVD release, as well as a 21-minute interview with Toback that was exclusive to the Blu-ray release.

Reception
On Rotten Tomatoes the film has a critic rating of 51% from 63 reviews, with an average rating of 5.66/10. The site's consensus reads, "Two Girls and a Guy has an intriguing premise and a talented trio of leads, but doesn't do quite enough with any of them to make the end result truly worth a watch".

On an April 1998 episode of their program, Siskel and Ebert gave it two thumbs up. Jack Mathews of the Los Angeles Times said: "Two Girls and a Guy" takes a lot of dubious side trips and ends with an event so unexpected it could have come from a different movie. Maybe if Toback had taken 11 days to write the script and four to shoot it, things would have worked out better. As it is, "Two Girls" is a small movie with some big moments and a lot of unfinished business.
In his review for the Chicago Sun-Times, Roger Ebert commented on Robert Downey Jr.'s performance: "Downey, whatever his problems, is a fine actor, smart and in command of his presence, and he's persuasive here as he defends himself: 'I'm an actor. And actors lie.' There is a show-stopping scene when he looks at himself in a mirror and warns himself to get his act together." Janet Maslin of The New York Times said: "When actors fall into tabloid hell, their careers too often are already on the skids. But Downey, who recently completed jail time for drug-related problems, proves again here that he is, professionally speaking, at the height of his powers. 'Two Girls and a Guy' bursts into life as soon as this wildly inventive actor saunters into the story bellowing Vivaldi, and from that point on, it hangs on his every word. The two women here, especially the talented and ravishing Ms. Graham, aren't able to do anything of comparable interest."

A more negative review came from Deseret News, who gave the film only half a star. They write, "Featuring one of the worst film performances in recent history (from newcomer Natasha Gregson Wagner, daughter of the late Natalie Wood), this wildly over-the-top black comedy about two women (Wagner and Heather Graham) who confront their "shared" boyfriend (Robert Downey Jr.) doesn't score with any of the points it tries to make."

References

External links 
 
 

1997 films
American comedy-drama films
1997 comedy-drama films
Films directed by James Toback
Films about actors
Films set in New York City
Films about threesomes
Fox Searchlight Pictures films
1990s English-language films
1990s American films